Inna Vyacheslavovna Trazhukova (born 11 September 1990) is a Russian wrestler, World champion 2019. She represented her country at the 2016 Summer Olympics where she lost the bronze medal match against Polish wrestler Monika Michalik.

She claimed that Mikhail Mamiashvili, the president of the Wrestling Federation of Russia, hit her twice in the face for losing the bronze medal match. Mamiashvili did not deny the attack but said that Trazhukova did not make enough effort to win the match.

Trazhukova is the 2011 European bronze medalist and two-time Russian national champion (2015, 2016). She won the gold medal at the 2019 World Wrestling Championships in Kazakhstan.

References

External links
 

1990 births
Living people
Russian wrestlers
Wrestlers at the 2016 Summer Olympics
Olympic wrestlers of Russia
World Wrestling Championships medalists
European Wrestling Championships medalists
21st-century Russian women